Senator Blaisdell may refer to:

Clesson J. Blaisdell (1926–1999), New Hampshire State Senate
Daniel Blaisdell (1762–1833), New Hampshire State Senate